Love Under the Sun is a 2003 Hong Kong musical short film directed by Andy Lau. It depicts an evening ball in which a rumor spreads among the guests that one among them has contracted AIDS. The film was meant to raise awareness about AIDS and dispel common misconceptions regarding its contagiousness. It features an all-star cast of Lau and various other Hong Kong cinema actors and Cantopop singers. The music is mostly arranged from Classical works such as Für Elise and Carmen with added or changed lyrics.

Cast
Andy Lau
Aaron Kwok
Sean Lau
Louis Koo
Sammi Cheng
Kelly Chen
George Lam
Sally Yeh
Nicholas Tse
Cecilia Cheung
Anthony Wong
Karen Mok
Shawn Yue
Gigi Leung
Denise Ho
Hacken Lee
Jordan Chan
Charlene Choi of Twins
Gillian Chung of Twins
Theresa Fu of Cookies
Stephy Tang of Cookies
Miki Yeung of Cookies
Kary Ng of Cookies
Yumiko Cheng
Wong You-nam of Shine
Chui Tien-you of Shine
Benz Hui
Kenny Kwan
Lam Suet
Edmond Leung
Emme Wong
Lee Fung
Lung Tin-sang
Bonnie Wong

External links

2003 films
2003 short films
2000s musical films
Hong Kong short films
2000s Cantonese-language films
Milkyway Image films
Films set in Hong Kong
Films shot in Hong Kong
2000s Hong Kong films